Cercomonads are small flagellates, widespread in aqueous habitats and common in soils.

Characteristics
The cells are generally around 10 μm in length, without any shell or covering.  They produce filose pseudopods to capture bacteria, but do not use them for locomotion, which usually takes place by gliding along surfaces.

Most members have two flagella, one directed forward and one trailing under the cell, inserted at right angles near its anterior.  The nucleus is connected to the flagellar bases and accompanied by a characteristic paranuclear body.

Classification
Genetic studies place the cercomonads among the Cercozoa, a diverse group of amoeboid and flagellate protozoans.  
They are divided into two families.  
 The Heteromitidae tend to be relatively rigid, and produce only temporary pseudopods.  
 The Cercomonadidae are more plastic, and when food supplies are plentiful may become amoeboid and even multinucleate.

The classification of genera and species continues to undergo revision.  Some genera have been merged, like Cercomonas and Cercobodo. Others like Helkesimastix, Sainouron and Cholamonas have been moved to Helkesida, while the rest of the family Heteromitidae has been moved to Glissomonadida.

 Order Cercomonadida Poche 1913 sensu Bass et al. 2009
 Genus Paracercobodo Hovasse & Combescot 1959
 Family ?Krakenidae Dumack, Mylnikov & Bonkowski 2017
 Genus Kraken Dumack et al. 2016
 Family Paracercomonadidae Cavalier-Smith & Karpov 2012
 Genus Brevimastigomonas Brabender et al. 2012
 Genus Metabolomonas Brabender et al. 2012
 Genus Nucleocercomonas Brabender et al. 2012
 Genus Paracercomonas Cavalier-Smith & Bass 2006
 Family Cercomonadidae Kent 1880 sensu Karpov et al. 2006 [Cercobodonidae Hollande 1942]
 Genus Eocercomonas Karpov et al. 2006
 Genus Filomonas Cavalier-Smith & Karpov 2012
 Genus Cavernomonas Vickerman 2009
 Genus Cercomonas Dujardin 1841 emend. Karpov et al. 2006 non emend. Ekelund et al. 2004 [Neocercomonas Ekelund, Fredslund & Daugbjerg 2004; Cercobodo Krassilstschick 1886; Cercomastix Lemmermann 1913; Dimastigamoeba Blochmann 1894; ?Mukdeniamonas Skwortzov 1960; ?Changia Skwortzov 1960 non Sun 1924; ?Reptomonas Kent 1880; Dimorpha Klebs 1892 non Gruber 1882]
 Genus Neocercomonas Ekelund, Daugbjerg & Fredslund 2004

References

 
Cercozoa orders